A positive axillary lymph node is a lymph node in the area of the armpit (axilla) to which cancer has spread. This spread is determined by surgically removing some of the lymph nodes and examining them under a microscope to see whether cancer cells are present.

References
 Positive axillary lymph node entry in the public domain NCI Dictionary of Cancer Terms

Lymphatic organ diseases
Oncology